= Mesoleuctra =

Mesoleuctra Temporal range: Jurassic

Scientific classification
- Kingdom: Animalia
- Phylum: Arthropoda
- Class: Insecta
- Order: Plecoptera
- Family: †Mesoleuctridae
- Genus: †Mesoleuctra; Brauer et al., 1889

Type species
- Mesoleuctra gracilis Brauer et al., 1889

Extinct genus of stoneflies

Mesoleuctra is a genus of stoneflies that lived in the Jurassic period.

Species included:

- †Mesoleuctra brachypoda
- †Mesoleuctra exserta
- †Mesoleuctra gigantea
- †Mesoleuctra gracilis
- †Mesoleuctra peipiaoensis
- †Mesoleuctra quadrata
- †Mesoleuctra tibialis
